The 1929 Gonzaga Bulldogs football team was an American football team that represented Gonzaga University as an independent during the 1929 college football season. In their first year under head coach Robert L. Mathews, the Bulldogs compiled a 4–3 record and outscored opponents by a total of 104 to 100.

Schedule

References

Gonzaga
Gonzaga Bulldogs football seasons
Gonzaga Bulldogs football